Gerstell is an unincorporated community located  in Mineral County, West Virginia, United States.

References 

Unincorporated communities in West Virginia
Unincorporated communities in Mineral County, West Virginia